University of Nevada Press is a university press that is run by the Nevada System of Higher Education (NSHE). Its authority is derived from the Nevada state legislature and Board of Regents of the NSHE. It was founded by Robert Laxalt in 1961. The university is in Reno, Nevada. It is owned and operated by the University of Nevada.

See also

 List of English-language book publishing companies
 List of university presses

References

External links
 

1961 establishments in Nevada
Education in Nevada
Nevada System of Higher Education
Publishing companies established in 1961
Nevada, University of
University of Nevada, Reno